Anatoly Andreyevich Motsny (25 September 1922 – 1 February 1960) was a senior lieutenant of the Red Army, a participant in the Eastern Front of World War II, and a Hero of the Soviet Union, stripped of all titles and awards due to conviction.

Biography 
Anatoly Motsny was born on 25 September 1922 in Shklow, Mogilev Region of the Byelorussian Soviet Socialist Republic, into a working-class family. He graduated from tenth grade in school. In February 1941, he was called to serve in the Red Army. In August 1942, he graduated from the armored vehicle school in Gorky. From October 1942, he served on the Eastern Front.

Motsny began to participate in actions on the Don Front in November 1942. He was appointed commander of a platoon of T-34 tanks of the 16th Separate Tank Regiment. In January 1943, he was wounded. From March 1943, he saw action on the Southwestern Front, commanding a platoon of KV heavy tanks of the 22nd separate tank regiment. In April 1943, Motsny was sent to the reserve of the 29th Separate Training Tank Regiment and, from June of the same year, to the 2nd Reserve Tank Regiment of the Ural Military District.

In August 1943, Lieutenant Motsny was appointed commander of a platoon of T-34 tanks in the 54th Guards Tank Brigade on the Voronezh Front until the end of the war. On 28 August, he was lightly wounded and soon returned to his unit. Until October 1943, the brigade took part in battles in Ukraine. From 4-11 November 1943, Motsny took part in the liberation of Kiev. On 6 November 1943, Motsny, on his tank, managed to destroy up to 100 enemy carts with military cargo and property, ten vehicles, and about 100 German soldiers and officers retreating from Kiev. Motsny's tank was knocked out in battle by a Tiger I, but the tank's crew captured a communications vehicle with six radio stations and five guns in battle. When the retreating column was utterly defeated, Motsny's tank was withdrawn from the battlefield for repairs. For this battle, the battalion commander presented Motsny and the driver of his tank, Morozov, the rank of Hero of the Soviet Union. However, the award was reduced by higher commanders, and as a result, they were awarded the Order of the Red Banner.

From December 1943 to February 1944, Motsny was twice slightly wounded but soon returned to service. On 25 February, in the Proskuriv area, he was seriously injured. On 17 July 1944, in the battle for the village of Kiritsa, he neutralized an anti-tank gun and its crew on his tank. The tank was knocked out in the battle, and Motsny, wounded, killed 11 German soldiers and officers with a machine gun. When the machine gun became unusable, Motsny killed two German soldiers in hand-to-hand combat with a knife. His actions allowed his subordinates to get out of enemy fire.

He particularly distinguished himself during the Vistula–Oder offensive. On 14 January 1945, the brigade crossed the Nida near the village of Motkowice and captured the town of Jędrzejów. Moving further, tankmen from the battalion of Hero of the Soviet Union Khokhryakov, which included Motsny's platoon, defeated an oncoming German convoy of equipment, a military airfield, и освободил город Nagłowice. On 16 January, tankers, crossing the Pilica, liberated the city of Koniecpol. On the way to the city of Częstochowa, the village of Mstów was fortified by the enemy. Motsny's platoon was among the first to break into the city's streets; in the battle for the city, they inflicted heavy losses on the enemy. In the street battle for Czestochowa, Motsny's tank was hit, but the crew continued to fight. Motsny, firing from a machine gun, was shell-shocked and seriously wounded in the shoulder, a fragment of armor knocked his eye out, but he did not leave the battlefield until the city was completely cleared. In an unconscious state, he was taken to a first-aid post. All three tanks of Motsny's platoon were lost, and their commanders, Zolotov and Zaitsev, were killed.

For the capture of Czestochowa, the 54th Guards Tank Brigade was awarded the Order of Lenin. The battalion commander, Khokhryakov, was presented with the second star of the Hero of the Soviet Union. Motsny and the driver-mechanic of his tank, Ivanov, were nominated for Hero of the Soviet Union. On 10 April 1945, by the Decree of the Presidium of the Supreme Soviet of the Soviet Union, for "exemplary fulfillment of combat missions of the command on the front of the struggle against the Nazi invaders and the courage and heroism shown at the same time," Senior Lieutenant Motsny was awarded the high title of Hero of the Soviet Union with the award of the Order of Lenin and the Gold Star number 6541.

Despite the severe injury he received and the loss of his left eye, Motsny returned to duty by the beginning of the Battle of Berlin, in which he participated. After the end of the war, for some time, he served as the commander of a support platoon in his battalion; however, due to the six wounds received during the war, he was declared unfit for combat service, and in September 1945, he was transferred to the reserve.

He was also awarded the medals Order of Lenin (04/10/1945), the Red Banner (01/30/1944), and the Patriotic War I degree (08/08/1944).

Forfeiture of the title of Hero and awards 
Upon returning to his native Shklow, Motsny worked as chairman of the committee for physical culture and sports of the Shklow regional executive committee. He married Vera Komissarova, a hospital nurse whom he met in 1944. Family life did not work out, and Motsny drove his pregnant wife out of the house. Subsequently, having a second passport, he remarried in Kiev.

On the night of 31 March - 1 April 1952, Tatyana Motsnaya, Anatoly's mother, returning home from work, found her house on fire. Her grandson and son of Anatoly, 5-year-old Gennady, was brutally killed: his head was broken, and his leg was broken in the knee. The corpse was covered with rags, among which were Anatoly's two bloody shirts, underwear, and top. In the morning, Anatoly was found hiding in the cesspool of the latrine. His documents were found there as well.

On 7 June 1952, Motsny was convicted under Article 80 of the Criminal Code of the Byelorussian SSR (banditry), and since the death penalty for murder was abolished at the time, he was sentenced to 25 years in a labor camp. After the cassation appeal, the article of the verdict, as deliberately inappropriate, was reclassified as murder, and the sentence was set at ten years.

He was released early in April 1958, after which he returned to Shklow. According to the testimony of local authorities, after his release, he led an asocial lifestyle, abused alcohol, did not work anywhere, and "terrorized the local population."

On 1 July 1959, by a decree of the Presidium of the Supreme Soviet of the USSR, Motsny was deprived of all titles and awards for “committing acts incompatible with the status of an order bearer”. He died on 1 February 1960.

References

Bibliography 
 Конев В. Н. Прокляты и забыты. Отверженные Герои СССР. — М. Яуза, 2010

1922 births
1960 deaths
Filicides
Hero of the Soviet Union forfeitures
People from Częstochowa
Soviet military personnel of World War II
Soviet murderers of children
Soviet people convicted of murder